Bosses Will Be Bosses is the second studio album by American rap group The Delinquents, released September 7, 1999 on Dank or Die Records. It was produced by The Delinquents, Dot., Happy Perez, J-Cutt, Mike D, One Drop Scott and Twelve, and executive produced by G-Stack and V-Dal. The album was voted as one of the top forty best independent albums of 1999 in a Murder Dog magazine poll. It features guest performances by Too Short, Richie Rich, Otis & Shug, Mack 10, Yukmouth, Money-B, 3X Krazy, B-Legit and Brotha Lynch Hung.

Along with a single, a music video was released for the song, "That Man" featuring Bart and Harm.

Track listing 
"Delinquents Are Back" (featuring Too Short) – 3:58
"That Man" (featuring Bart & Harm) – 3:07
"Renegades" (featuring J-Dubb & Agerman) – 4:13
"Haters" (featuring Richie Rich, Otis & Shug) – 4:37
"Senorita" (featuring Mack 10 & Yukmouth) – 4:37
"Last Chance" (featuring DT of The Dominion) – 3:46
"Talk'n Dirty" (featuring Money-B, Dot, J Cutt & 3rd Rail Vic) – 4:45
"Doing It Live" (featuring Master P) – 4:30
"Thinking Bout Home" (featuring Askari X) – 3:53
"I'm A Delinquent" (featuring Father Dom) – 3:38
"Our House (Dank or Die)" (featuring Chris Locket) – 3:45
"Everybody" (featuring The Whoridas, Rhythm & Green & Keak Da Sneak) – 4:00
"Bitch Niggas" (featuring B-Legit & Richie Rich) – 5:03
"Armageddon" (featuring C-Loc & Young Bleed) – 4:47
"Halloween" (featuring Brotha Lynch Hung) – 4:21
"No Fun" (featuring Will of Tony! Toni! Toné!) – 4:04
"Smile Now, Cry Later" – 3:20
"You Me & He" (featuring Otis & Shug) – 4:27

References

External links 
[ Bosses Will Be Bosses] at Allmusic
Bosses Will Be Bosses at Discogs
Bosses Will Be Bosses at Tower Records

1999 albums
Albums produced by Happy Perez
Horrorcore albums
The Delinquents (group) albums